Barney Miller is an American sitcom television series set in a New York City Police Department police station on East 6th St in Greenwich Village. The series was broadcast on ABC Network from January 23, 1975, to May 20, 1982. It was created by Danny Arnold and Theodore J. Flicker. Noam Pitlik directed the majority of the episodes. It spawned a spin-off series, Fish, that ran from February 5, 1977, to May 18, 1978, focusing on the character Philip K. Fish.

Premise
Barney Miller takes place almost entirely within the confines of the detectives' squad room and Captain Barney Miller's adjoining office of New York City's fictional 12th Precinct, located in Greenwich Village. A typical episode featured the detectives of the 12th bringing in several complainants and/or suspects to the squad room. Usually, there are two or three separate subplots in a given episode, with different officers dealing with different crimes. Rarely, about once a year, an episode would feature one or more of the detectives outside of the walls of the precinct, either on a stakeout or at their homes.

Cast

Regulars

Recurring characters

Other officers and staff

‡ 

There were a number of character actors who made frequent appearances in different roles, among them Don Calfa (7 episodes), Rod Colbin (7), Phil Leeds (7), Ralph Manza (7), Oliver Clark (6), Arny Freeman (6), Peggy Pope (6), Fred Sadoff (6), Philip Sterling (6), Kenneth Tigar (6), Martin Garner (5), Walter Janowitz (5), Howard Platt (5), Leonard Stone (5), Ivor Francis (4), Jay Gerber (4), Larry Gelman (4), Michael Lombard (4), Edwin Malave (4), Rosanna DeSoto (4), Todd Susman (4), Michael Tucci (4), Sal Viscuso (4), Candice Azzara (3), Eugene Elman (3), Bruce Kirby (3), Jack Kruschen (3), Richard Libertini (3), Kay Medford (3), Nehemiah Persoff (3), Titos Vandis (3), Michael Durrell (2), Alix Elias (2), Peter Jurasik (2), Jenny O'Hara (2), Walter Olkewicz (2) and Lyman Ward (2).

12th Precinct regulars
The 12th Precinct had a number of regular complainants, habitués of the holding cell, or other people who often dropped by.  Characters seen on three or more episodes included:

‡

Guest stars

 Luis Avalos
 Bonnie Bartlett
 Billy Barty
 Todd Bridges
 Roscoe Lee Browne
 Miriam Byrd-Nethery
 Don Calfa
 Diana Canova
 Oliver Clark
 David Clennon
 Jeff Corey
 James Cromwell
 Danny Dayton
 Jack Dodson
 David Dukes
 Nancy Dussault
 Herbert Edelman   
 Marla Gibbs
 Florence Halop
 David Lander
 Richard Libertini
 Christopher Lloyd
 Dave Madden
 Barney Martin
 A Martinez
 Caroline McWilliams
 Kay Medford
 Dick O'Neill 
 Ben Piazza
 Charlotte Rae
 Jack Riley
 Larry B. Scott
 Ray Sharkey
 Trinidad Silva
 Queenie Smith
 Brett Somers
 Jeffrey Tambor
 Michael Tucci
 David Wayne
 William Windom

Fish's family
Fish's wife Bernice made an appearance from time to time in Seasons 1 to 4. In Seasons 1, 3 and 4 she was played by Florence Stanley (in a total of seven appearances); in Bernice's only Season 2 appearance she was portrayed by Doris Belack. In that episode, Fish also had a grown daughter named Beverly, played by Emily Levine. Also seen as recurring characters in Season 3 were group home children Jilly (Denise Miller) and Victor (John Cassisi), who would eventually become Fish's foster children. In 1977, the Fishes were spun off into their own show, Fish which also starred Barry Gordon, who memorably played an embezzler who gets a pay raise and promotion in Season 5 and a lawyer representing Wojo in Season 8.

Barney's family
In addition to Barney's wife Liz, Barney's son David (Michael Tessier) and daughter Rachel (Anne Wyndham) appeared in the pilot. Barney's son was written out of the show after the first episode (though was still occasionally mentioned), while his wife made appearances through the second season, and very sporadically thereafter. Wyndham also reprised her role in two later episodes, Season 1, episode 5 "The Courtesans", and Season 7, episode 140 "Rachel".

"Wojo's Girl"
Darlene Parks played Wojo's ex-prostitute girlfriend Nancy in a 2-episode arc in Season 5. The episodes focus on the 'period of adjustment' following Nancy's move into Stan's apartment.

Pilot
The series was born out of an unsold television pilot, The Life and Times of Captain Barney Miller, that aired on August 22, 1974, as part of an ABC summer anthology series, Just for Laughs. Linden and Vigoda were cast in their series roles; no other eventual cast members were present. Abby Dalton played Barney Miller's wife, Liz, while Val Bisoglio, Rod Perry, and a pre-Hill Street Blues Charles Haid rounded out the cast of the pilot. Guest stars included Mike Moore, Chu Chu Mulave, Henry Beckman, Buddy Lester, Michael Tessier and Anne Wyndham.

The pilot script was later largely reused in the debut episode Ramon. For this reworked episode, Bisoglio's lines were more or less evenly split between the new characters of Yemana and Chano, while Haid's character of Kazinski became Max Gail's Wojciehowicz. Rod Perry's character, Sgt. Wilson, was replaced by Harris in the reworked episode, although Wilson would reappear one more time in the first-season episode Experience before disappearing from the series entirely. Abby Dalton was replaced by Barbara Barrie as Liz, and Henry Beckman's character of Uncle Charlie was dropped entirely. The rest of the guest cast (Moore, Malave, Lester, Tessier and Wyndham) reprised their roles in the debut episode.

Unlike the remainder of the series, the pilot was shot on film at CBS Studio Center, where the sets of the 12th Precinct and the Miller apartment were originally built. When the show went into regular production in late 1974, it was recorded on videotape. The sets were moved to the ABC Television Center in Hollywood, where they remained until production ended in 1982.

The pilot was never broadcast in syndication. It was released in 2011 as part of Shout Factory's complete series set on DVD.

Episodes

Opening theme
The show's instrumental jazz fusion theme music, written by Jack Elliott and Allyn Ferguson, opens with a distinctive bass line performed by studio musician Chuck Berghofer. The bass line was improvised by Berghofer at the request of producer Dominik Hauser: "Can you do something on the bass? This guy is a cop in New York. Can we just start it out with the bass?" The theme song was ranked No. 23 and No. 27, respectively, by Complex and Paste magazines, in their lists of "best TV theme songs".

The theme plays over the Manhattan skyline, followed by shots of the characters and opening credits. Season 1 opened and closed with a shot of Midtown Manhattan as seen from Weehawken, New Jersey. Season 2 onward opened with a shot of Lower Manhattan as seen from Brooklyn Heights, with a barge being towed in the foreground, and closed with a shot of the Midtown Manhattan skyline as seen from Long Island City. Several versions of the theme were used during different seasons, sometimes more than one within the same season, with minor variations in composition and performance. The one version used for Season 3, however, is said to be the most well-known.

Production

Staging
Production of Barney Miller deliberately resembled a theatrical stage play; scenes rarely strayed from the precinct station's squad room, with its prominent open-barred holding cell, and Miller's adjoining office. The room was said to be on the second or third floor, depending on the episode. Clutter was plentiful and much of it seemed immobile over the years, including a coat hanging on a clothes rack near Harris' desk. A handful of episodes (fewer than a dozen of 170) were partially or fully set in other locations, including a stakeout location ("Stakeout"), a hospital room ("Hair"), an undercover operation ("Grand Hotel"), a jail (three separate rooms in "Contempt"), a hotel room ("Chinatown"), and the apartments of Barney ("Ramon" and "Graft"), Chano ("The Hero"), Fish ("Fish") and Wojo ("Wojo's Girl"). In "The DNA Story," we finally see the inside of the men's room. Barney Miller tended to obey two of the three classical unities of drama: unity of place and unity of time. The third unity, unity of action, was not followed, since each episode had multiple subplots.

Barney Miller was one of the few sitcoms of the period that occasionally mentioned the then-current year or allowed the audience to infer the then-current year.

Taping
Barney Miller was notorious for its marathon taping sessions. Early seasons were recorded before a live studio audience and used a laugh track for sweetening reactions during post-production. Creator and executive producer Danny Arnold would then rewrite and restage entire scenes after the audience departed, actively looking for quieter, subtler moments that would not play well before a crowd; a taping session that began in the afternoon or early evening would then continue into the early morning hours. Max Gail referred to this in the Jack Soo retrospective episode aired on May 17, 1979, remarking that one of the clips shown was a scene that "we finished around 2:30 in the morning." In a 1977 blooper, a crew member mentions it being 3:15 a.m.

Writer Tom Reeder described working on the show:

Employing a live audience became impractical as lengthy reshoots became commonplace. By Season 4, only a quiet laugh track was used when necessary.

Barney Miller's wife
When Barney Miller premiered in January, 1975, actress Barbara Barrie was hired as a regular cast member to play Liz Miller, Barney's wise, faithful, and loving wife. She received second billing in the opening credits after Hal Linden. During that half-season, Barrie appeared in seven episodes out of thirteen. At that time, the premise of the show was to focus on Barney's career as a police captain at the 12th precinct as well as his home life with his wife and children.

At the start of the 1975–76 season, when it became evident that storylines at the 12th precinct were taking precedence, Barrie went to producer Danny Arnold and asked to be released from the show. Arnold reluctantly agreed and Barrie appeared in only two episodes that year: “The Social Worker", which was the second episode of the second season, and the holiday installment “Happy New Year”. But she continued to receive second billing in the opening credits throughout the second year.

In the third season, Barrie's character as well as Barney's children were occasionally mentioned but never seen. In the spring of 1978, Barrie returned to the series as a guest star reprising her role of Liz Miller in the episode “Quo Vadis”. In that episode, Barney gets shot on duty, but survives his attack virtually unharmed. Liz, upset by the incident and unable to stand the pressures of being a policeman's wife, gives Barney an ultimatum to either give up his police job so they can move to a safer neighborhood or end their marriage. At the end of the episode, Barney and Liz separate.

During the 1978–79 season, Barrie made her final appearance on Barney Miller in the Christmas show “Toys”. In that episode, Liz meets Barney at the 12th precinct on Christmas Eve to discuss celebrating the holidays with their children, leading up to the possibility of a reconciliation. After this episode, Liz is never seen again, but toward the end of the fifth season, Barney happily announces to his staff that he and Liz have ended their separation and that he is moving back to their apartment. Despite Barrie's absence, her character continues to be mentioned throughout the rest of the show's run.

Fish
In the first season of Barney Miller, the character of Fish (played by Abe Vigoda) proved so popular that ABC was considering a spin-off as early as October, 1975. The series, Fish, premiered on February 5, 1977. It focused on the domestic side of Fish's life as he and his wife Bernice (played by Florence Stanley) became foster parents to five racially mixed children known as “Persons In Need Of Supervision” (PINS). Fish continued to appear sporadically in the second half of Season 3 of Barney Miller while also starring in Fish. During the 1977–78 season, Fish officially retired from the NYPD in Season 4, Episode 2 episode of Barney Miller. Fish had reasonably good ratings, but did not match Barney Miller'''s. ABC was going to renew the show for a third season, but, according to cast member Todd Bridges, Vigoda demanded more money than the producers were willing to pay. As a result, ABC canceled Fish in May 1978 without a series finale. Vigoda did not return to Barney Miller as a regular cast member, but in the spring of 1981, he did make a final appearance as Fish as a guest in the seventh-season episode "Lady and the Bomb", thus giving his character some closure.

Wojo Pilot
After Fish was canceled, a special one-hour episode of Barney Miller aired on January 25, 1979. It was created as a pilot episode for another possible Barney Miller spin-off to star series regular Max Gail. Titled “Wojo's Girl”, the first half of the episode was set at the 12th precinct in which Wojo (played by Gail) decides to have his girlfriend Nancy, a former prostitute (played by Darlene Parks), live with him. The second half of the installment takes place entirely in Wojo's apartment as he and Nancy try and struggle to adjust to living together. The pilot did not sell, Park's character of Nancy was never seen again and Gail remained with Barney Miller until the series ended in the spring of 1982.

Linda Lavin
Shortly after the premiere of Barney Miller in early 1975, actress Linda Lavin guest starred as Detective Janice Wentworth on the eighth episode "Ms. Cop". Her character in that installment went over very well with audiences and Lavin was brought back as a semi-regular for Barney Miller's second year. During that season, a romance began at the 12th precinct between Detective Wentworth and Detective (Wojo) Wojciehowicz (played by Max Gail). However, at the same time, Lavin had just completed a television pilot for CBS called Alice, which was based on the Academy Award-winning film Alice Doesn't Live Here Anymore. The pilot quickly sold to CBS and they included it on their schedule for the 1976–1977 season. As a result, Lavin left Barney Miller at the end of the show's second season. Alice ran for nine years on CBS and immediately established Lavin as a television star. Lavin never returned to Barney Miller although her character of Detective Janice Wentworth was briefly seen in a flashback in the last episode of the series "Landmark: Part 3".

Death of Jack Soo
Towards the end of the fourth year, Jack Soo was diagnosed with esophageal cancer and was absent for the last five episodes of the 1977–78 season. To help fill the void during his medical leave, actress Mari Gorman was brought in for three installments as Officer Rosslyn Licori. Cast member Ron Carey's role of Officer Carl Levitt was also expanded at this time to compensate for Soo's absence. Soo returned to Barney Miller at the start of the 1978–79 season but his cancer had already metastasized and spread very quickly. As a result, he was only able to complete nine episodes that year. By the time he taped his last appearance which was the installment "The Vandal" that aired on November 9, 1978, Soo's illness was quite evident in his rapid weight loss. Two months later, he died on January 11, 1979, at the age of 61. The fifth-season finale "Jack Soo: A Retrospective" aired on May 17, 1979, and was a tribute to him. For this installment, the cast of Barney Miller led by Hal Linden appeared as themselves on the 12th Precinct office set as they fondly shared stories and reminiscences about Soo as an actor and as a friend. At the end of the episode, the cast raised their coffee cups in loving memory of Jack Soo.

Paul Lieber
During the seventh season, in an attempt to fill the void left by Jack Soo, a new character was added to Barney Miller. In November, 1980, actor Paul Lieber was cast as Detective Sergeant Eric Dorsey. Dorsey had a jaded, cynical attitude who initially alienated his colleagues at the 12th precinct by assuming they were all corrupt. Even though he eventually realized that his convictions were not true, the character was not popular with viewers. As a result, Lieber's tenure on the show lasted only a few weeks with his character of Dorsey reassigned to another precinct. (Incidentally, Lieber had made a previous appearance on Barney Miller during the previous season in a small role as a gunman in the episode "The Architect").

LGBT
Marty and Darryl were among the earliest recurring gay characters on American television. Danny Arnold worked closely with the Gay Media Task Force, an activist group that worked on LGBT representation in media, in developing the characters. Initially both characters were presented in a stereotypically effeminate manner but in later appearances Darryl began dressing and speaking in a more mainstream fashion. Officer Zitelli's coming out was not the first gay storyline on American television, but was a memorable one.

Slow ratings growth
The series took a while to become a hit, but ABC supported it anyway.

In the 1975 "The Courtesans" episode (S1 E5) with Nancy Dussault, creator/producer/showrunner Danny Arnold threatened to quit his own show, if network censors removed a risque line. The network relented and the resulting publicity over the x-rated episode that was banned in two markets ensured the series' ratings survival, according to Hal Linden.

Danny Arnold ended production of Barney Miller in 1982 after eight seasons for fear of repeating storylines; the show was not canceled by the network.

Reception by policeBarney Miller retains a devoted following among real-life police officers, who appreciate the show's emphasis on dialog and believably quirky characters, and its low-key portrayal of cops going about their jobs. In a 2005 op-ed for the New York Times, New York police detective Lucas Miller wrote:

Similarly, during his appearance on Jon Favreau's Independent Film Channel talk show Dinner for Five, Dennis Farina, who worked as a Chicago police officer before turning to acting, called Barney Miller the most realistic cop show ever seen on television.

Awards and honorsBarney Miller won a DGA Award from the Directors Guild of America in 1981. The series won a Primetime Emmy Award for Outstanding Comedy Series in 1982, after it ended. It received six other nominations in that category, from 1976 to 1981. The series won Primetime Emmy Awards for Outstanding Writing in a Comedy Series in 1980 (in addition to nominations in 1976, 1977 and 1982), Outstanding Directing in a Comedy or Comedy-Variety or Music Series in 1979, and was nominated for a number of others. It won Golden Globe Awards for Best Television Comedy or Musical Series in 1976 and 1977 (from a total of seven nominations), and won a Peabody Award in 1978. In 2013, TV Guide ranked Barney Miller at No. 46 on its list of the 60 best series of all time.

Home media
Sony Pictures Home Entertainment has released the first three seasons of Barney Miller on DVD in Region 1. Season 1 was released on January 20, 2004, to slow sales, and Sony decided not to release any more seasons. However, the decision was later reversed and Season 2 was released in 2008 (four years after the release of Season 1), followed by Season 3 in 2009.

Shout! Factory acquired the rights to the series in 2011 and subsequently released a complete series set on October 25, 2011.  The 25-disc set features all 168 episodes of the series as well as bonus features and the first season of the Abe Vigoda spin-off, Fish''.

In 2014, Shout! began releasing individual season sets, season 4 was released on January 7, 2014, season 5 on May 13, 2014. Season 6 on December 9, 2014. and Season 7 on April 7, 2015, followed by the eighth and final season on July 7, 2015.

Season 1 was released on DVD in Region 4 on December 20, 2006.

Notes

References

External links

 
 
 The Barney Miller homepage
 TV.com: Barney Miller

 
1970s American sitcoms
1970s American police comedy television series
1970s American workplace comedy television series
1975 American television series debuts
1980s American sitcoms
1980s American police comedy television series
1980s American workplace comedy television series
1982 American television series endings
American Broadcasting Company original programming
Best Musical or Comedy Series Golden Globe winners
English-language television shows
Fictional portrayals of the New York City Police Department
Mill
Mill
Peabody Award-winning television programs
Primetime Emmy Award for Outstanding Comedy Series winners
Television characters introduced in 1974
Television series by Sony Pictures Television
Television shows set in Manhattan